Leo Marx (November 15, 1919 – March 8, 2022) was an American historian, literary critic, and educator. He was Professor of the History and Philosophy of Science at the Massachusetts Institute of Technology. He is known for his works in the field of American studies. Marx studied the relationship between technology and culture in 19th and 20th century America.

Early life and education 
Leo Marx was born on November 15, 1919, in New York City, to Leo and Theresa (Rubinstein) Marx. His father worked in the estate sales business and his mother was a homemaker. He grew up in New York City and Paris; his father died when Leo was a child. He graduated from Harvard University with a BA in history and literature in 1941. Military service in World War II followed, in the South Pacific. Marx returned to Harvard afterwards and got a PhD in 1950, one of the first to be granted in the History of American Civilization.

Career
Marx taught at the University of Minnesota from 1949 to 1958 and then at Amherst College from 1958 to 1977 before joining the faculty of MIT in 1976. His intellectual work is associated with John William Ward.

From 1976 to 2015, Marx was the William R. Kenan Jr. Professor of American Cultural History at MIT. He changed his teaching style accordingly, since students at MIT were more interested in technology than in literature. Marx added environmental studies to his repertoire. After retirement in 1990, he continued on as a senior lecturer until 2015.

In 1964, Marx published The Machine in the Garden. The book explores 19th century American literature and its contrast of the pastoral ideal with the rapid changes caused by emerging technology. Marx called the style the "interrupted idyll". The book was based upon a thesis Marx began at Harvard and took 15 years to finish. It is seen as a major, foundational work in the field of American studies.

Personal life 
Marx married Jane T. Pike in 1943. Together they had two sons and a daughter. His wife died in 2006.

Marx died at his home in Boston on March 8, 2022, at the age of 102.

Awards and honors
Marx was awarded Guggenheim Fellowships in 1961 and 1965.

 Fulbright Lecturer three times in Europe
 Leonardo da Vinci Medal 2002
 Rockefeller Fellowship
 American Academy of Arts and Sciences, member
 American Studies Association
 American Literature Section of the Modern Language Association

Selected publications 
 Marx, Leo (1964). The Machine in the Garden: Technology and the Pastoral Ideal in America. New York: Oxford University Press.
 Marx, Leo (1989). The Pilot and the Passenger: Essays on Literature, Technology, and Culture in the United States. New York: Oxford University Press. .
 Marx, Leo; Smith, Merritt R. (1994). Does Technology Drive History? The Dilemma of Technological Determinism. Cambridge, Massachusetts: MIT Press. .

See also 

American studies
Cultural studies
Technological progress
Progress
F. Scott Fitzgerald

Notes

References

1919 births
2022 deaths
20th-century American historians
21st-century American historians
American centenarians
American literary critics
Amherst College faculty
Fellows of the American Academy of Arts and Sciences
Harvard College alumni
Harvard Graduate School of Arts and Sciences alumni
Historians of technology
Leonardo da Vinci Medal recipients
MIT School of Humanities, Arts, and Social Sciences faculty
Men centenarians
Military personnel from New York City
United States Navy personnel of World War II
Philosophers of technology
Writers from New York City